Yang Shuai may refer to:
 Yang Shuai (footballer)
 Yang Shuai (speed skater)